Simon Halfon is a graphic designer most noted for his work with The Jam, The Style Council, and Paul Weller. Halfon has also worked with Oasis, Nick Heyward and George Michael, among others.  Halfon's most visible work has focused on solid inspiration from the design of the 1960s.  He has, however, displayed examples of a more current and sleek style as well. His work on the Style Council's house music efforts was noticed by George Michael, who had Halfon apply a similar approach to his Listen Without Prejudice album in 1990.

Designs with Weller 

Halfon began working for Paul Weller in 1983. Designing record sleeves for The Style Council starting with 1983's Café Bleu The Style Council sleeves had a contemporary feel with a close eye on sixties design.
The Style Council made a bold turn into contemporary Rhythm and Blues in 1987. Halfon designed the International Orange gatefold sleeve for their The Cost of Loving album.  The shade of orange is noted for its use in "setting things apart from their surroundings", but in the case of the Golden Gate Bridge it is also seen as a master stroke of beauty.  The Style Council's sleeve was a hefty gatefold containing two solid slabs of 12" vinyl EPs and was swathed entirely in the color, opening the gatefold reveals high-contrast black and white photographs of the group, a crisp visual contrast that might have been a commentary on music as well (black and white). This was Halfon's homage to Richard Hamilton's cover art for The Beatles 'white album'.

Halfon borrowed from Peter Blake's "The First Real Target" for the debut single by The Paul Weller Movement.
On Weller's "Out of the Sinking" single, it seems Marvin Gaye's "What's Goin On" cover may be referenced.  The single came from an album (1995's Stanley Road) that made deliberate reference to the Beatles with its title and Peter Blake (Sgt. Pepper's Lonely Hearts Club Band) cover collage (design supervised by Halfon).  After "Out of the Sinking", and as the album was released for journalistic review with the Blake cover, the British press started hailing Weller's renewed stature in British rock history. Halfon has also worked with Oasis for many years designing record sleeves and taking behind the scenes photographs of the group. 2006 saw Halfon reuniting with Peter Blake to work on the cover of Stop the Clocks, The Best Of Oasis.

Halfon has created record sleeves for numerous artists including The Who, James Brown and John Lennon. He is also known for his work with George Michael most notably 1990's Listen Without Prejudice, Vol. 1. A simple yet iconic album cover using Weegee's famous Coney Island photograph.

Film
In 2007, he produced his first feature film, Sleuth, starring Michael Caine and Jude Law. The film was directed by Kenneth Branagh with a screenplay written by Harold Pinter.

References

British graphic designers
Living people
Year of birth missing (living people)